Dead Men Running is a 1971 Australian mini series based on the final novel by D'Arcy Niland about the effect in Australia of the political troubles in Ireland early in the twentieth century.

References

External links
Dead Men Running at IMDb
Dead Men Running at AustLit

1970s Australian television miniseries
1971 Australian television series debuts
1971 Australian television series endings